The Wigan Warriors play Rugby League in Wigan, England. Their 2014 season results in the Super League XIX, 2014 Challenge Cup, and 2014 World Club Challenge are shown below.

World Club Challenge

As winners of the 2013 Super League Grand Final, Wigan Warriors qualified for the 2014 World Club Challenge. The game, which took place in Australia, saw Wigan lose to Sydney Roosters, champions of the 2013 NRL Grand Final.

Super League

Regular season

Matches

Source:

Table

Play-offs

Source:

Challenge Cup

After finishing second in the Super League XVI, Wigan Warriors entered the 2014 Challenge Cup at the fourth round. Last year's winners won in the fourth and fifth rounds before being eliminated by Castleford Tigers in the quarter finals.

References

Wigan Warriors seasons
Super League XVII by club